Julian Barbour (born 1937) is a British physicist with research interests in quantum gravity and the history of science.

Since receiving his PhD degree on the foundations of Albert Einstein's general theory of relativity at the University of Cologne in 1968, Barbour has supported himself and his family without an academic position, working part-time as a translator (although he has an Oxford University email address and his research has been funded, for example by a FQXi grant). He resides near Banbury, England.

Timeless physics
His 1999 book The End of Time advances timeless physics: the controversial view that time, as we perceive it, does not exist as anything other than an illusion, and that a number of problems in physical theory arise from assuming that it does exist. He argues that we have no evidence of the past other than our memory of it, and no evidence of the future other than our belief in it. "Difference merely creates an illusion of time, with each individual moment existing in its own right, complete and whole." He calls these moments "Nows". It is all an illusion: there is no motion and no change. He argues that the illusion of time is what we interpret through what he calls "time capsules", which are "any fixed pattern that creates or encodes the appearance of motion, change or history".

Barbour's theory goes further in scepticism than the block universe theory, since it denies not only the passage of time, but the existence of an external dimension of time. Physics orders "Nows" by their inherent similarity to each other. That ordering is what we conventionally call a time ordering, but does not come about from "Nows" occurring at specific times, since they do not occur, nor does it come about from their existing unchangingly along the time axis of a block universe, but it is rather derived from their actual content.

The philosopher J. M. E. McTaggart reached a similar conclusion in his 1908 "The Unreality of Time."

Machian dynamics
Barbour also researches Machian physics, a related field. The Machian approach requires physics
to be constructed from directly observable quantities. In standard analytical dynamics a system's future evolution can be determined from a state consisting of particle positions and momenta (or instantaneous velocities). Barbour believes that the Machian approach eschews the momenta/instantaneous velocities, which are not directly observable, and so needs more than one "snapshot" consisting of positions only. This relates to the idea of snapshots, or "Nows" in Barbour's thinking on time.

Along with physicist Bruno Bertotti, Barbour developed a technique called "best matching" for deriving gravitational equations directly from astronomical measurements of objects' spatial relations with each other. Published in 1982, the method describes gravitational effects as accurately as Einstein's general relativity, but without the need for a "background" grid of spacetime. According to physicist David Wiltshire at the University of Canterbury in New Zealand, such a truly Machian or relational approach could explain the appearance of an accelerated expansion of the universe without invoking a causative agent such as dark energy.

Criticism of Barbour's ideas
Theoretical physicist Lee Smolin repeatedly refers to Barbour's ideas in his books. However Smolin is usually highly critical of Barbour's ideas, since Smolin is a proponent of a realist theory of time, where time is real and not a mere illusion as Barbour suggests. Smolin reasons that physicists have improperly rejected the reality of time because they confuse their mathematical models—which are timeless but deal in abstractions that do not exist—with reality. Smolin hypothesizes instead that the very laws of physics are not fixed, but that they actually evolve over time.

Theoretical physicist Sean Carroll has criticised Barbour and all physicists who adhere to a "timeless-view" of the universe:

The problem is not that I disagree with the timelessness crowd, it's that I don't see the point. I am not motivated to make the effort to carefully read what they are writing, because I am very unclear about what is to be gained by doing so. If anyone could spell out straightforwardly what I might be able to understand by thinking of the world in the language of timelessness, I'd be very happy to re-orient my attitude and take these works seriously.

Books

Sole author
 1999. The End of Time: The Next Revolution in our Understanding of the Universe. Oxford Univ. Press. ; 
 2001. The Discovery of Dynamics: A Study from a Machian Point of View of the Discovery and the Structure of Dynamical Theories. 
 2006. Absolute or Relative Motion?. . Paperback reprinting of The Discovery of Dynamics.
2020. The Janus Point: A New Theory of Time   Basic Books.

Co-author 
 1982 (with B. Bertotti). Mach's Principle and the Structure of Dynamical Theories.
 1994 (with Vladimir Pavlovich Vizgin) Unified Field Theories in the First Third of the 20th Century . .
 1996 (with Herbert Pfister) Mach's Principle: From Newton's Bucket to Quantum Gravity. Birkhaueser. .

See also 
 Shape dynamics

References

Further reading
Scientific work by others bearing on Barbour's theories
 Anderson, Edward (2004) "Geometrodynamics: Spacetime or space?" PhD thesis, University of London.
 Anderson, Edward (2007) "On the recovery of Geometrodynamics from two different sets of first principles", Stud. Hist. Philos. Mod. Phys. 38: 15.
 Baierlein, R. F., D. H. Sharp, and John A. Wheeler (1962) "Three-dimensional geometry as the carrier of information about time", Phys. Rev. 126: 1864–1865.
 Max Tegmark (2008) "The Mathematical Universe", Found. Phys. 38: 101–150.
Wolpert, D. H. (1992) "Memory Systems, Computation, and The Second Law of Thermodynamics", International Journal of Theoretical Physics 31: 743–785. Barbour argues that this article supports his view of the illusory nature of time.

External links

 
 	The End Of Time: A Talk With Julian Barbour
  Discover December 2000 From Here to Eternity
 Killing Time A 25-minute feature about the idea that time is an illusion, filmed by Dutch TV in December 1999 and first shown early in 2000
 The End of Time, Chapter One (requires free registration)
 Video (with mp3 available) of Barbour discussion on Bloggingheads.tv
 Does Time Exist? 2012 lecture at the Perimeter Institute for Theoretical Physics

1937 births
British relativity theorists
Quantum gravity physicists
Living people
Independent scientists
Alumni of the University of Cambridge
Philosophical cosmologists
Philosophers of time
Historians of physics